Pasir putih is a busy sub-district in the center of Jambi City, Sumatra, Indonesia.

Buildings
There are many big stores all along the street. Electronic stores, clothes stores or Boutiques, Food stores or café or restaurants and self-service stored served there. Pasir Putih has many important buildings such as Airport, BMKG office building and tower, and many favorite schools from state schools into private schools. Sultan Thaha Airport Jambi is the one airport in Jambi province. Now, the government is rebuilding the national airport into an international airport. BMKG office building and tower is near Sultan Thaha Airport, about 1 km from the airport.

Schools
SDN 78 (elementary school), SMPN 6 (junior high school), and SMK 2 (vocational high school) are the famous states schools there, and SD Puri Indah (elementary school), SMP & SMA EL-MUNDO (junior & senior high school) is the famous private school in Jambi city.

Tourism
Besides important buildings, Pasir Putih also has tourism destinations about 1 km from Sultan Thaha Airport. In a big area in the center of the city, the government built a zoo, park and MTQ Arena (area for read Quran competition) in one location. Taman Rimba Zoo has many animals, and the famous ones are orangutans, Sumatran tiger, and elephants. In front of the zoo there is a park named Taman Rimba Park. In the park, there are many traditional houses, from regencies in Jambi province and also there is also an old temple. Beside the park there is a big field (MTQ Arena) that is used as a sports field. During the 2000s the government built the MTQ Arena to hold Quran reading competitions. In short, Pasir Putih is one of the busy sub-districts in the city center, but Pasir Putih has also tourism destinations.

Jambi (city)